Mahmoud Alaa Eldin Mahmoud Ibrahim (born 28 January 1991) is an Egyptian professional footballer who plays as a defender for Egyptian Premier League club Al Ittihad and the Egyptian national team.  He competed for the Egyptian team at the 2012 Summer Olympics.

Honours
Zamalek

Egyptian Premier League: 2020–21, 2021–22
Egypt Cup: 2017–18, 2018–19, 2020–21
Egyptian Super Cup: 2019
CAF Confederation Cup: 2018–19
CAF Super Cup: 2020
Saudi-Egyptian Super Cup: 2018

References

External links

1991 births
Living people
Footballers from Cairo
Egyptian footballers
Egypt youth international footballers
Egypt international footballers
Olympic footballers of Egypt
Association football defenders
Egyptian Premier League players
Footballers at the 2012 Summer Olympics
Haras El Hodoud SC players
Wadi Degla SC players
Zamalek SC players
2019 Africa Cup of Nations players
2021 Africa Cup of Nations players